Saint-Symphorien is a commune in the Cher department in the Centre-Val de Loire region of France.

Geography

Population

Sights
 The church of St. Symphorien, dating from the twelfth century (Historic monument).

See also
Communes of the Cher department

References

External links

Official website 
Saint-Symphorien on the Quid website 

Communes of Cher (department)